Karl-Josef Hering (14 February 1929 –  20 May 1998) was a German opera singer (tenor). In the 1960s and 1970s he was one of the most sought-after hero tenors worldwide.

Biography 
Born in Westönnen, Westphalia as the son of a furniture manufacturer, Hering had his first musical appearances during his high school days at the Mariengymnasium in Werl. He studied economics to join his parents' business. After the commercial diploma exam in Cologne in 1955, he studied singing with Frederick Husler, Franz Völker and Max Lorenz.

He made his debut in 1958 in Hanover, where he progressed from the First Prisoner in Fidelio to Florestan, the hero of Beethoven's opera. In 1964 he moved to Krefeld and in 1966 to Berlin, where one of his earlier roles was Max in Der Freischütz. Hering had been a permanent member of the Deutsche Oper Berlin from 1966 to 1979 and was named Berliner Kammersänger in 1975 for his long-standing international achievements.

Especially in his main roles, the Wagner singer appeared as Siegfried, Siegmund, Parsifal, Tristan, but also as Max, Canio, Stolzing, Florestan, Bacchus, Erik and others in addition to German theaters such as Hamburg, Frankfurt, Düsseldorf, Stuttgart, Berlin State Opera worldwide in London, Vienna, Amsterdam, Rome, Paris, Los Angeles, Tokyo, Buenos Aires, Toronto, etc., with conductors such as Sir Georg Solti, Eugen Jochum, Karl Böhm, Zubin Mehta, Horst Stein, Lorin Maazel, Erich Leinsdorf, Joseph Keilberth, and Silvio Varviso.

Occasional acting roles such as in the movie  were also part of Hering's repertoire.

In the late 1970s, a hip joint disease forced the singer to give up his active stage career.
Since then he worked as a hotelier with businesses on the island of Fehmarn, in the Hochsauerland and most recently in Berlin.

Karl-Josef Hering was buried in the Zehlendorf forest cemetery in Berlin-Nikolassee.

References

External links 
 
 

German opera singers
1929 births
1998 deaths
Burials at the Waldfriedhof Zehlendorf